King Cheng of Chu (died 626 BC) was from 671 to 626 BC king of the state of Chu during the Spring and Autumn period of ancient China. He was born Xiong Yun to King Wen of Chu, and King Cheng was his posthumous title.

In 672 BC Xiong Yun's older brother king Du'ao tried to kill him, and he escaped to the state of Sui. He then attacked and killed Du'ao with the help of Sui, and succeeded Du'ao as king of Chu.

In the summer of 648 BC, the State of Huang was annexed by the state of Chu.

King Cheng's wife was Zheng Mao. Their son was possibly King Mu of Chu.

The Shiji gives a detailed account of the events surrounding King Cheng's succession and untimely end.  In the forty-sixth year of his reign (626 BC), Cheng wanted to make Shangchen (商臣), the future King Mu, his crown prince.  Lingyin (title for prime minister of Chu) Zishang (子上) advised against this, fearing that there were many contenders for the position and that, if the king were to change his mind and act to replace the crown prince, a disturbance would ensue.  He also warned the king that Shangchen was a cruel and fierce man who was unsuitable for the position.  Not heeding the advice, King Cheng made Shangchen his crown prince.

Soon, the king did indeed change his mind, and rumors spread that the crown prince was about to be deposed, and another son Zhi (職) was going to be made the new crown prince.  The crown prince was unsure whether to believe the rumors.  His tutor advised him to throw a banquet for the king's favorite concubine but to treat her disrespectfully during the banquet.  The prince did what was suggested, and the concubine, angered by her poor treatment, told the crown prince, "It is suitable that the king wants to kill you and make Zhi his crown prince!"  Now sure of the king's intentions, the prince's tutor asked him, "Are you able to serve under Zhi?" "No," he answered.  "Are you able to go into exile?" "No," he answered.  Finally, he asked, "Are you able to do something big?"  "Yes," the prince replied.

During the tenth month, Shangchen led palace troops to surround King Cheng and force him to commit suicide.  King Cheng asked to eat a bear paw before dying, but he was rebuffed.  On day dingwei, King Cheng hanged himself, and Shangchen ascended the throne.

References

Monarchs of Chu (state)
7th-century BC Chinese monarchs
626 BC deaths
Year of birth unknown
Chinese kings
Suicides by hanging in China
Forced suicides of Chinese people
7th-century BC murdered monarchs
Assassinated Chinese politicians
Suicides in China
Ancient people who committed suicide